Malaysia national football team 1963–present results.

Results

Keynotes

 * Malaysia's score always listed first
 (H) Home country stadium
 (A) Away country stadium
 (N) Neutral venue stadium
 1 Non FIFA 'A' international match
 XI Malaysia uses a selection of players from the Malaysia Super League, Using the name Malaysia XI

2020–present results

2010–2019 results

2019

2018

2017

2016

2015

2014

2013

2012

2011

2010

2000–2009 results

2009

2 FIFA revoked the ‘A’ international classification for both matches once it was discovered that a Zimbabwe club team, Monomotapa United impersonated as the Zimbabwe national team and were not approved by the Zimbabwe Football Association (ZIFA).

2008

2007

2006

2005

2004

2003

2002

2001

2000

1990–1999 results

1999

1998

1997

1996

1995

1994

1993

1992

1991

1990

1980–1989 results

1989

1988

1987

1986

1985

1984

1983

1982

1981

1980

1970–1979 results

1979

1978

1977

1976

1975

1974

1973

1972

1971

1970

1963–1969 results

1969

1968

1967

1966

1965

1964

1963

Notes

See also
 Malaysia national football team honours

References

External links
 Malaysia Fixtures and Results on FIFA.com
 Football Association of Malaysia